The Single File is a video compilation and box set by the English musician Kate Bush. The video compilation album was released in 1983, and it contains the first twelve videos released by the artist. It was followed by a boxset called The Single File 1978~1983. The box included thirteen singles on individual vinyl records.

The Single File – Video

The Single File is a 1983 collection of music videos by Kate Bush. It is the second video release by the artist. It was released on VHS, Beta Max and later on Laserdisc in Japan. It features the UK version of "Wuthering Heights" and the original video of "Wow".

Track listing
 "Wuthering Heights" - 4:30
 "The Man with the Child in His Eyes" - 2:49
 "Hammer Horror" - 4:11
 "Wow" - 3:47
 "Them Heavy People" - 4:05
 "Breathing" - 4:52
 "Babooshka" - 3:30
 "Army Dreamers" - 3:16
 "Sat in Your Lap" - 3:32
 "The Dreaming" - 4:06
 "Suspended in Gaffa" - 4:00
 "There Goes a Tenner" - 3:23

Personnel
 Paul Henry – Director
 Keef – Director
 Brian Wiseman – Director
 Kate Bush – Artistic Concepts, Choreography By
 Chris Achileos – Babooshka Costume Illustration
 Pamela Keats – Babooshka Costume Realization
 Assorted iMaGes – Packaging
 Kindlight – Photography

The Single File 1978~1983 – Box Set

The Single File 1978~1983 is a boxed set released on 23 January 1984, available only on vinyl. It contained all Kate Bush's 7" singles and their B-sides up until that point, and her live EP On Stage. The box set primarily included her UK singles. The European single "Suspended in Gaffa" and the Irish single "Night of the Swallow" were not included but "Ne t'enfuis pas (remix)" single was. The boxset also included a lyric book.

"I'm surprised that I've got this amount of material together in five years," Bush remarked. "I'm thrilled, really... I mean, it is a form of 'greatest hits'. It's just put in a box and it's a nicer way of doing it."

Track listing
Disc 1 (Wuthering Heights)
"Wuthering Heights"
"Kite"

Disc 2 (The Man with the Child in His Eyes)
"The Man with the Child in His Eyes"
"Moving"

Disc 3 (Hammer Horror)
"Hammer Horror"
"Coffee Homeground"

Disc 4 (Wow)
"Wow"
"Fullhouse"

Disc 5 (Kate Bush on Stage)
"Them Heavy People"
"Don't Push Your Foot on the Heartbrake"
"James and the Cold Gun"
"L'Amour Looks Something Like You"

Disc 6 (Breathing)
"Breathing"
"The Empty Bullring"

Disc 7 (Babooshka)
"Babooshka"
"Ran Tan Waltz"

Disc 8 (Army Dreamers)
"Army Dreamers"
"Delius"
"Passing Through Air"

Disc 9 (December Will Be Magic Again)
"December Will Be Magic Again"
"Warm And Soothing"

Disc 10 (Sat in Your Lap)
"Sat in Your Lap"
"Lord of the Reedy River"

Disc 11 (The Dreaming)
"The Dreaming"
"Dreamtime (Instrumental)"

Disc 12 (There Goes a Tenner)
"There Goes a Tenner"
"Ne t'enfuis pas"

Disc 13 (Ne t'enfuis pas)
"Ne t'enfuis pas (remix)"
"Un baiser d'enfant"

References

Kate Bush albums
Kate Bush video albums
1984 compilation albums
1983 compilation albums
1983 video albums
B-side compilation albums
Music video compilation albums
EMI Records compilation albums
EMI Records video albums
Art rock albums by English artists
Art rock compilation albums
Art pop albums
Baroque pop albums
Progressive rock albums by English artists
Progressive rock compilation albums
Progressive pop albums
Avant-pop albums